Doctor on the Go is a British television comedy series based on a set of books by Richard Gordon about the misadventures of a group of doctors. The series follows directly from its predecessor Doctor at Sea and was the final series to be produced by London Weekend Television. The two series ran from 1975-77.

Writers for the Doctor on the Go episodes were Douglas Adams, Graham Chapman, Rob Buckman, Richard Laing, George Layton, Jonathan Lynn, Bernard McKenna, Steve Thorn and Paul Wolfson.

Cast
 Robin Nedwell - Dr Duncan Waring
 Geoffrey Davies - Dr Dick Stuart-Clark
 Ernest Clark - Professor Geoffrey Loftus
 Andrew Knox - Dr James Gascoigne
 John Kane - Dr Andrew MacKenzie
 Jacquie-Ann Carr - Dr Katherine Wright

Episodes

Series 1

 "Keep Your Nose Clean"
 "When a Body Meets a Body"
 "It's the Thought That Counts"
 "Radio Activity"
 "A Run for Your Money"
 "Learning by Heart"
 "It's Just the Job"
 "What's Op Doc?"
 "Room for Change"
 "A Heart in the Right Place"
 "What's your Problem?"
 "Clunk Click"
 "The Course of True Love"

Series 2

 "When Did You Last See Your Father?"
 "I Love Paris... When I Get There"
 "Money Spasms"
 "What's in a Name?"
 "The War of the Wards"
 "For Your Own Good"
 "Bunny Makes the World Go Round"
 "Loftus the Terrible"
 "A Turn for the Nurse"
 "M*A*T*C*H"
 "California Girl"
 "Sunday Bleeping Sunday"
 "Happy Ever After"

Cultural and social impact
Jamaican reggae group The Upsetters recorded a song called "Doctor on the Go" containing sound clips from the show for their 1975 album Revolution Dub.

References

External links
Doctor on the Go at British TV Comedy Guide

1970s British sitcoms
Doctor in the House
English-language television shows
First-run syndicated television programs in the United States
1970s British medical television series
ITV sitcoms
1975 British television series debuts
1977 British television series endings
Television shows set in London
Television series by ITV Studios
London Weekend Television shows